Long War can refer to:
Long Turkish War, a war between the Habsburgs and the Ottoman Empire from 1593 to 1606 
Long War (20th century), a concept describing several wars from 1914 to 1990 as one long war
Long War (Provisional IRA strategy), a strategy followed by the Provisional IRA since the 1970s
"Long War", a name proposed in 2006 by U.S. military leaders for the War on Terror
The Long War (novel), a science fiction novel by Terry Pratchett and Stephen Baxter
Long War (mod), a partial conversion modification to the video games XCOM: Enemy Unknown and XCOM: Enemy Within
The Long War, 2010s dark fantasy book series by A.J. Smith

See also
 List of wars extended by diplomatic irregularity for a list of wars made very long by diplomatic technicalities
Perpetual war, a military and political concept
List of longest wars
The Longest War: The Enduring Conflict between America and Al-Qaeda, a 2011 book by Peter Bergen